The Austrian Ice Hockey Association (ÖEHV) is an association of Austrian sports clubs with ice hockey activities.

The highest-level hockey league in Austria is the Austrian Hockey League which is also called Erste Bank Eishockey Liga.

Notable people
Presidents
 Walter Wasservogel, 1962 to 1977.
 Hans Dobida, 1977 to 1996.
 Dieter Kalt Sr., 1996 to 2016.

Secretary general
 Rita Hrbacek, 1989 to 2004.

References

External links 
 Official website

Ice hockey in Austria
International Ice Hockey Federation members
Ice hockey governing bodies in Europe
Ice and inline hockey